Cleophus C. Hatcher (June 18, 1925 – August 1983) was an American football coach.  He served as the head football coach at Claflin College
—now known as Claflin University—in Orangeburg, South Carolina, Mississippi Vocational College—now known as Mississippi Valley State University—in Itta Bena, Mississippi, Morris College in Sumter, South Carolina, and Cheyney State Teachers College—now known as Cheyney University of Pennsylvania.  Hatcher attended West Virginia State University, where he played football as a tackle.  There he also played baseball and ran track.  He later did gradated works at West Virginia University.

References

1925 births
1983 deaths
American football tackles
Claflin Panthers football coaches
Cheyney Wolves football coaches
Howard Bison football coaches
Mississippi Valley State Delta Devils football coaches
Morris Hornets football coaches
West Virginia State Yellow Jackets baseball players
West Virginia State Yellow Jackets football players
College men's track and field athletes in the United States
West Virginia University alumni
African-American coaches of American football
African-American players of American football
African-American basketball players
African-American male track and field athletes
20th-century African-American sportspeople